is a 1992 Japanese animated television series adaptation of Maria Louise Ramé's 1872 novel A Dog of Flanders, produced by Tokyo Movie Shinsha. 26 episodes were produced.

The show was adapted and distributed in France by Ares Films.

See also 
 Dog of Flanders (1975 TV series), Nippon Animation's adaptation of Maria Louise Ramé's novel.

References

External links 
 My Patrasche at TMS' English website
 

1992 anime television series debuts
Animated television series about dogs
Animated television series about orphans
Drama anime and manga
Historical anime and manga
TMS Entertainment
Works based on A Dog of Flanders